William Hemingway Mills (1834-1918) was a British civil engineer known for his work with the Great Northern Railway of Ireland (GNR(I)) from its formation in 1876 until his retirement in 1910.

Life
Mills was born in Yorkshire, England in 1834.

He came under the instruction of the William Henry Barlow from 1850.  Mills undertook work in Scotland, Andalusia and Mexico before becoming Chief Engineer of the GNR(I) from its formation in 1876.

Mills was to introduce a polychromatic brick style to many buildings in his designs for the GNR(I).

He was to work at the GNR(I) until his retirement in 1910 in his mid–70s.  Mills died at his home in Glenageary, County Dublin on 12 January 1918, aged  83.

Literary works

Further reading

References

Notes

Footnotes

Sources
 
 

1834 births
1918 deaths
English civil engineers
Engineers from Yorkshire
Great Northern Railway (Ireland)